Retrospective is a double-disc compilation of Red House Painters' songs from the band's 4AD era. The compilation was released in July 1999. Disc one is a collection of definitive Red House Painters tracks culled from their debut album Down Colorful Hill through 1995's Ocean Beach, as picked by 4AD label owner Ivo Watts-Russell. Disc two, subtitled Demos, Outtakes, Live (1989-1995), is a collection of unreleased demos and live recordings from their 4AD years. The essay inside the booklet was written by Rob O'Connor in April 1999. A working title for this collection was Red Perspective.

Track listing

Credits
"Waterkill" (1990 demo) and "Instrumental"(1995 demo) previously unreleased.
Art direction and design by v23.
Wire photograph by Chris Bigg; lighthouse photograph by Dominic Davies.
Liner notes by Rob O'Connor (credited to "Rob O'Condor"; this is a typographical error. Rob O'Connor also penned the liner notes for the vinyl edition of Mark Kozelek's Admiral Fell Promises album in 2010).

Release history

References 

Red House Painters albums
1999 compilation albums
4AD compilation albums
Albums produced by Mark Kozelek